Mieses is a surname. Notable people with the surname include:

Abraham Mieses, Dominican Republic boxer
Jacques Mieses (1865–1954), German-born English chess Grandmaster and writer
Józef Mieses (1892–1942), Polish teacher, linguist, rabbi and military officer
Samuel Mieses (1841–1884), German chess master